The following is a list of U.S. cities and dates in which their city councils consisted of a majority of women as elected or appointed members.

List
 Newport, Rhode Island (2014, 4/7)
 Asheville, North Carolina (2017, 4/7)
 Amarillo, Texas (2017, 3/5)
 Providence, Rhode Island (2018, 8/15)
 Tulsa, Oklahoma (2018, 6/9)
 Portland, Oregon (2019, 3/5)</ref>
 Boston, Massachusetts (2019, 8/13)
 Albuquerque, New Mexico (2019)
 St. Petersburg, Florida (2019, 6/8)
 Bangor, Maine (2019, 6/9)
 Houston, Texas (2019, 9/16)
 South Bend, Indiana (2019, 5/9)
 Knoxville, Tennessee (2019, 7/9)
 San Antonio, Texas (2019, 6/11)
 Phoenix, Arizona (2021, 6/9)
 Pensacola, Florida (2020, 4/7)
 Santa Fe, New Mexico (2020, 5/8)
 Washington, D.C. (2020, 7/13)
 West Hollywood, California (2020, 3/5) 
 New York City, (New York City Council)  (2022, 31/51)

References

City councils in the United States
Women city councillors in the United States